Tata Daewoo (officially Tata Daewoo Commercial Vehicle Company) is a commercial vehicle manufacturer headquartered in Gunsan, Jeollabuk-do, South Korea and a wholly owned subsidiary of Tata Motors. It is the second-largest heavy commercial vehicle manufacturer in South Korea.

History 
The company was established in 2002 as "Daewoo Commercial Vehicle Co. Ltd", after it was spun off from parent Daewoo Motors.

In 2004 it was acquired by Tata Motors, India's largest passenger automobile and commercial vehicle manufacturing company. The Tata Daewoo has a collaboration with Tata Motors its parent company in India. 

Tata Daewoo Korea and Afzal Motors-Pakistan signed a Technical Assistance Agreement on 12 December 2005 in Pakistan. The assembling plant of Afzal Motors in Pakistan was inaugurated by Prime Minister of Pakistan Mr. Shaukat Aziz on 8 January 2007. And assembles Truck Chassis and Daewoo Dump Trucks.

In 2013, the Vehicular Authority of South Korea has ordered that the trucks sold by Tata Daewoo Commercial Vehicles, has been recalled due to a steering failure. The 3,276 trucks sold in these country has been repaired and now are in service.

Tata Daewoo-Korea and BadanBas-Malaysia signed a Technical Assistance Agreement in May 2015 in Malaysia. In 2017 Tata-Daewoo began to sell their trucks under the Daewoo brand in South Korea.

Products

Current

 Novus Series (Tata Daewoo, 2004)
 Prima Series (2009~Present)
 The CEN (2020~Present)
 MAXEN (2022~Present)
 KUXEN (2022~Present)

Discontinued
 GMK/Chevrolet/Isuzu Truck - CKD provided by Saehan Motor Company, 1971 (now GM Korea)
 SMC Truck Isuzu Truck- CKD provided by Saehan Motor Company, 1976 (now GM Korea)
 Daewoo/Isuzu Elf Truck - CKD provided by Saehan Motor Company, 1976 (now GM Korea).
 Daewoo/Isuzu Light Truck - CKD provided by Saehan Motor Company (now GM Korea), with assistance from Isuzu, 1983.
 Daewoo/Isuzu Truck New Elf Model - CKD provided by Daewoo Motor Company (now GM Korea), with assistance from Isuzu, 1986.
 Daewoo Truck New Model - CKD provided by Daewoo Motor Company (now GM Korea), with assistance from Isuzu, 1986.
 Daewoo Truck Super New Model - Own development from Daewoo Motor Company Design Department, 1993.
 Daewoo Chasedae (Next Generation) - Own development from Daewoo Motor Company Design Department, 1995.

In all of its recent versions, these trucks are engined by a Euro VI emissions standard engines.

References

External links

 

Truck manufacturers of South Korea
South Korean brands
Vehicle manufacturing companies established in 2002
Daewoo
Tata Motors
South Korean companies established in 2002
2004 mergers and acquisitions